Sagabala is a small town and commune in the Cercle of Kolokani in the Koulikoro Region of south-western Mali. As of 1998 the commune had a population of 15,464.

References

Communes of Koulikoro Region